Neeraj Sood is an Indian actor who appears mostly in Bollywood films and serials on National Television. He is best known for his roles in films like Matrubhoomi, Rocket Singh: Salesman of the Year, Samay and Shubh Mangal Saavdhan.

Early life and education 
Neeraj Sood was born on 18 October 1969 in Mandi, Himachal Pradesh. After completing his basic education from Vijay High School, Mandi, he acquired his graduation and post-graduation degree from Vallabh Govt College, Mandi.  He discovered his passion for acting while taking part in college plays. Coming from a middle-class family Neeraj Sood did not have the money to pay for Indian Theatre so he decided to join National School of Drama, New Delhi. After spending three years (1996-1999) at NSD and acquiring a diploma in acting, Neeraj finally came down to Mumbai to follow his dream of becoming an actor.

Acting career 
Neeraj Sood started his acting with career small screen. He managed to bag a role in Sony TV’s Missing in 1999. He soon started getting roles in many serials and by the year 2000 he was seen in popular serials like Kagaar, Drishtant, Lekin, Thriller@10, Kadam and B4line. In the same year he made his big screen debut in Bollywood with Kali Salwar. Two years later he was cast in critically acclaimed films like Ek Haseena Thi, Pinjar and Samay. Soon he started getting recognition as an actor.

Neeraj Sood has successfully managed to work in both small and big screens for years. Yahaan, Black & White, Agneepath, Tere Naam, Band Baja Baarat are some of his notable films, whereas Khauf, Hqeeqat, Kituu Sabb Jaantii Hai, Zindagi Khatti Meethi are some of his popular works on small screen.

Apart from acting in films and tele serials, Neeraj Sood has appeared in number of advertorials. He has worked for popular brands like Docomo, Cadbury Eclairs, Idea, Kala Hit, Perk, Just Buy App, Dailyhunt. Carwale.com, Birla Cement and Kosh Atta. His most popular advertorial appearance was Cadbury Miss Palanpur ad where he was cast alongside Amitabh Bachchan. He has also appeared in Star Plus Nayi Soch ad campaign alongside Aamir Khan, Sony Networks 'HAPPY INDIA' pack and Red Lebel Republic Day ad.

Personal life 
Neeraj Sood belongs to a middle class family from Mandi, Himachal Pradesh. He has one elder brother Raman Sood and one younger sister Ritu Mahajan. He married Anju Sood on 20 June 2005, a match arranged by his family.

Filmography

Upcoming films

Television series 
Neeraj Sood has appeared in more than 25 serials on Indian National Television.

References

External links 

1969 births
Living people
21st-century Indian male actors